Skrova is a small island group and village area in Vågan Municipality in Nordland county, Norway.

Village

The fishing village of Skrova lies on the northern part of the island group.  It exists mostly on the island of Heimskrova, but also includes parts of five other islands, including the northwestern edge of the large islands of Skrova.  The village is connected to the town of Svolvær (also in Vågan Municipality) and the village of Skutvika (in Hamarøy Municipality on the mainland) by regularly scheduled ferry routes.  The village has a population (2017) of 182, with nearly all the residents living in the village and the rest of the island group being virtually uninhabited.

The village gained privileged trading rights in 1760, and for a long time, it was the largest fishing village in Lofoten.

Industry
The main industry in Skrova is fishing, fish farming, and whaling. It is one of the largest whaling stations in Norway, taking in about half of the whale meat in Norway each year. The heyday of Skrova was in the 1970s and 1980s, when fishing and whaling were booming. Since the year 2000, there is now only one fishing factory, called Ellingsen's.

Geography and climate

The  Skrova island group is part of the Lofoten archipelago in the Vestfjorden south of the island Austvågøya. It close to Litlmolla and Stormolla. The largest island in the group is Storskrova and the island of Heimskrova is where most of the population is located. The six main inhabited islands in the group are all interconnected by a small bridge and several man-made causeways.

Skrova Lighthouse is located in the southwestern part of the island group, about 2 km away from the village of same name.  It was established in 1922 and not fully automated until 2005. There is also a meteorological weather station in the island group, near the lighthouse, with one of the longest recording series in Nordland county.
Skrova has a temperate oceanic climate (Cfb) despite the location 180 km north of the Arctic Circle. The wettest month recorded is December 1936 with 227 mm, and the driest is January 2014 with 0.9 mm.

Media gallery

See also
 List of islands of Norway

References

External links
http://www.skrova.no

Villages in Nordland
Islands of Nordland
Vågan
Populated places of Arctic Norway